Savage is an unincorporated community in Tate County, Mississippi, United States.

References

Unincorporated communities in Tate County, Mississippi
Unincorporated communities in Mississippi
Memphis metropolitan area